The men's 30 km cross country race at the 1956 Winter Olympics took place on 27 January. Fifty-one competitors from eighteen countries participated in the event. Finnish skier Veikko Hakulinen won the event by only 24 seconds over Swede Sixten Jernberg. Hakulinen and Jernberg would switch positions on the podium in the  event. Russian skier Pavel Kolchin won the bronze in the  event and also in the  event.

Medalists

Source:

Results

* - Difference is in minutes and seconds.

Source:

See also

 1956 Winter Olympics

Notes

References
 

Men's cross-country skiing at the 1956 Winter Olympics
Men's 30 kilometre cross-country skiing at the Winter Olympics